Chan-Hyo Bae (Korean: 배찬효; born 1975 in South Korea) is a visual artist based in London. He earned a Master of Fine Arts from The Slade School of Fine Art in University College of London in Fine Art Media and a Bachelor of Arts in Photography from Kyungsung University in South Korea. He is currently living and working in London.

Biography 

Chan-Hyo Bae was born June 22, 1975, in Busan, South Korea. He studied Photography at Kyungsung University in South Korea. He was initially a photojournalist but then a decision to study fine art in the UK changed everything. In September 2005 he started at the Slade School of Fine Art where he was taught by John Hilliard, a world-renowned conceptual artist who uses photography. This encounter was to alter Bae's perspective and approach as he became a fine artist. Living in London for the past decade has not always been an easy experience for Bae. He has at times felt alienated and isolated; an outsider using an unfamiliar language and living in a different culture. He describes a sense of dislocation, almost disconnection.  He also experienced, for the first time, racial prejudice which forced him to consider Western centric ideology that seeks to place a man like himself as ‘other’.  He describes this as the Western need to “exclude and diminish differences”. This sense of ‘outsiderness’ has become a core part of his work, as has his exploration of his own identity.

He has produced a range of work using photography. His style of approach is very theatrical and staged producing large scale color prints. In his first series of work entitled Existing in Costume (2006-2007) there is a central subject shown in full length portrait style wearing costumes and holding objects. His next series Fairy Tales Project  (2008-2010) has more elaborate staged shots involving quite large props and often several characters played by actors.  In Punishment Project (2011-2012) there is one main central figure, with glimpses of other people and characters in the frame. His latest series Witch Hunting Project (2013-2016) involves larger shots, often in landscape format, but in which only one main character appears along with scenes of miraculous events. Evolving across and between all these series are common concerns and themes which give a sense of his artistic voice.

Bae currently lives and primarily works in London, the UK.

Works 
Culture, Prejudice and Stereotypes are explored in the work of Korean Artist Chan-Hyo Bae. Since moving into London for further studying from South Korea, He has expressed in his work the feelings of cultural and emotional estrangement he experienced in the UK. Several series with the title Existing in Costume (2006 – 2016) saw him posing in variety of female historical western costumes, integrating himself into a history and society from which he felt excluded. Researched in meticulous detail, he created elaborate scenes of himself as a noblewoman from Elizabethan to Victoria periods.

More recent work in Existing in Costume series has drawn further on the idea of placing oneself into a collective consciousness within the dimensions of nationality. He has chosen as his subject Tudor history as well as the realms of western fairytales: stories that have permeated our culture and become embedded into our general psyche.

In his series, Jumping Into, Chan-Hyo Bae places himself at the center of paintings from the collection of the National Gallery in London by celebrated western painters, Titian, Rubens and Jan de Beer. He has selected paintings of Christian or Mythological subject. His historical impersonations enter the realm of the surreal, as the artist sets himself into a newly crafted animal skin patchwork painting. The paint seems to be cracking, disappearing in parts, as the artist pastes in the layers of his new composition.

From the latest work, Chan-Hyo Bae had a question asking whether absolute faith and extreme beliefs are the fundamental causes leading to the hatred and detestation, rejection and oppression, and madness and violence. He is seeking answers to this question from Occident's Eye project (2019-2020). Occident's Eye exposes the reality of violence represented by absolute faith. It recognises generosity and tolerance for others and the presence of communities living in ways different from humans, and asserts we need to try to live in harmony with all living things. And He challenged the limits of photography and attempted to extend the work to multi-dimensional installations and videos.

Exhibitions 
Chan-Hyo Bae's work has been shown in many international exhibitions including Kunsthalle Wien in Austria; Museum of Quai Branly in France; Jewish Museum in the UK; The Museum of Fine Art in USA; National Museum of Modern and Contemporary Art in Korea; Natural History Museum in France; Russian Museum in Russia; LEEUM Samsung Museum of Art in Korea; Vestfossen Kunst Laboratorium in Norway; Worker and Kolkhoz Woman Museum in Russia; Seoul Museum of Art in Korea; Daegu Art Museum in Korea; The Museum of Modern Art in Azerbaijan; Royal Academy of Arts in the UK; Pohang Museum of Steel Art in Korea; Museum of Arts and Design in USA;  Seoul Olympic Museum of Art in Korea; Colorado Photographic Arts Center in USA; Cite Internationale des Arts in France; GoEun Museum of Photography in Korea;  Aberystwyth Arts Centre in the UK; Gothenburg Museum of Art in Sweden; Baerum Kunsthall in Norway; Santa Barbara Museum of Art in USA; Govt. College of Fine Arts Museum in India; National Museum of Singapore in Singapore; The Museum of Photography in Korea; Savina Museum of Contemporary Art in Kore; Saatchi Gallery in the UK; Format International Photography Festival in the UK;  Progetti Arte Contemporanea in Italy; Chosun University Museum of Art in Korea; Wu-Min Art Center in Korea, Fondazione Palazzo Magnani, Italy etc...

.

.

Public collections 
Chan-Hyo Bae's work is found in major museum collections worldwide, including

 Museum of Fine Arts in Huston, USA 
 Deutsche Bank Art Collection in the UK 
 Leeum Samsung Museum of Art in Korea 
 Santa Barbara Museum of Art in USA
 Korea University Museum in Korea, 
 Statoil Art Collection in Norway
 University of Warwick Art Collection in the UK
 Suwon Ipark Museum of Art in Korea 
 Seoul Museum of Art in Korea
 ARARIO Museum in Korea
 Aberystwyth Arts Centre in the UK 
 Art Bank  National Museum in Korea 
 Colorado Photographic Arts Center in USA 
 Sovereign Art Foundation in Hong Kong 
 Hasselblad Foundation in Sweden 
 Space K Museum in Korea
 The Museum of Photography in Korea
Ben Uri Gallery and Museum in the UK
 Clamp Art Gallery in New york, USA

Publications 

 Occident's Eye, The Museum of Photography, Seoul: Korea, 2020  
 The Routledge Companion to Media and Fairy-Tale Cultures, Routledge: UK, 2018
 Existing in Costume, The Museum of Photography, Seoul: Korea, 2018
 Contemporary Korean Photography, HATJE CANTZ: Germany, 2017
 from DOG BRIDEGOOM to WOLF GIRL, Wayne State University Press: USA, 2015
 Contemporary Photography In Asia, PRESTEL; USA, 2013
 Fairy Tales Transformed?: Twenty-First-Century Adaptations and the Politics of Wonder, {{Citation needed|date={{subst:CURRENTMONTHNAME}} {{subst:CURRENTYEAR}}}}
 Wayne State University Press; USA, 2013
 Looking in: Photographic Portraits by Maud Sulter and Chan-Hyo Bae, Jewish Museum of Art; UK, 2013
 New Photography in Korea, Galerie Paris-Beijing; France, 2011
 Korean Eye; Contemporary Korean Art, SKIRA; UK, 2010
 Chaotic Harmony; Contemporary Korean Photography, Yale University Press: USA, 2009

References

External links 
Korea Joongang Daily; Magok's Space K Seoul transforms area into arts and culture hot spot by Moon So-Yong, September 28, 2020
The Hindu Newspaper; Chan-Hyo Bae on using self-portraits to make sense of his immigrant experience by Sindhuri Nandhakumar February 16, 2019
London Korean Links; by Events editor 16 Feb 2019
Sverges Television; Månlandningen fyller 50 – firas med fotoutställning, March 28, 2019
Times of India; Chan-Hyo Bae's work is about exploring the ambiguity of the definition of belief by Purnima Sah, Mar 24, 2019
Hyperallergic; Photographs Enliven the Public and Historic Spaces of an Indian City by Priyanka Sacheti, March 21, 2019
Korea Joongang Daily; Subverting the self-portrait by Moon So-Yong, February 24, 2019
Artsy; Chan-Hyo Bae - Jumping Into, March 3, 2019
The New York Times; 13 Artists on:Immigration by Zoe Lescaze, June 19, 2018
Asker og Baerums Budstikke; Nå kan du se forkledde foto i Bærum Kunsthall by Eyvind Sverre Menne, February 7, 2018 
Artnet; The 2017 Edition of START Art Fair Comes to London With a Focus on Asian Art by Naomi Rea, September 12, 2017
Visionarea Art Space: Sartor Resartus, September 30, 2015
Artnet; Rare Portrait of English Queen Anne Boleyn Identified Using Facial Recognition Software by Lorena Munoz-Alonso, February 18, 2015
Inhalemag; site by Isahido, June 6, 2014
Slate magazine; Cross-Dressing Throughout History to Fit In; by David Rosenberg, March 20, 2013
Photomonitor; by katy Barron and Amber Butchart, July 9, 2013
Art Daily; Looking in: Photography Portraits by Maud Sulter and Chan-Hyo Bae, July 12, 2013
Artribune; Crinoline, Corsetti e Parucche;by Slivia Somaschini, September 30, 2013
Artlys; Identity And Migration Themes within Contemporary Art Explored In New Exhibition by, June 13, 2013
Evening Standard; Looking In, Ben Uri Gallery - exhibition review, July 11, 2013
It's Nice That; Words Liv Siddall, August 13, 2012
Santa Barbara Independent; Contemporary Korean Photography at the Santa Barbara Museum of Art by Charles Donelan, July 22, 2010
Lenscratch; CHAN-HYO BAE: EXISTING IN COSTUME by Aline Smithson May 28, 2009
Purdy Hicks Gallery
Chennai Photo Biennale
MC2 Gallery

1975 births
Living people
South Korean photographers
Kyungsung University alumni